The Zaliv Shipbuilding Yard is located in Kerch, Ukraine (annexed by Russia) and specializes in the construction of tankers and container carriers, and the repair of ships of different types and tonnage.

The shipyard was also known as Kamysh-Burun Zavod, and Soviet Shipyard No. 532 named after Butoma Boris Evstaf'evich.

History 
The joint stock company Zalyv Shipyard was founded in 1938. It is situated on the shore of the Kerch Strait, between two seas, the Black Sea and the Sea of Azov. From 1945 to 1980 the yard built about 600 ships, including sea trawlers, small torpedo boats, fishing boats and barges. Since the 1960s it has built tankers.

The shipyard was formerly affiliated with the KrAZ Holding Company (Kremenchuk). As of April 2017 the company is owned by OOO Vesta (60%) and OOO Enkor (40%).

Facilities and services 
It has a graving dock that is 360 meters long and 60 meters wide. It can accommodate ships with a draught of 13 meters. Two gantry cranes, each with a 200-tons lifting capacity, are part of this dock.

Specialization 
 Type "Krym" Project 1511 tanker was built 1974-1980, created in 1973 by "Baltsudnoproekt"
 Project 12990 Pobeda tanker
 Panamax was built 1980-1996
 Nuclear-powered icebreaking cargo ship Sevmorput in the 1980s
 Series of stationary oil platform
 Several military frigates
 Krivak I class (along with Yantar and Severnaya Verf)
 Krivak III class (exclusively at Zalyv).

Building 
 Project 22800 corvette Tsiklon
 Project 22160 corvettes / patrol boats
 Project 23900 amphibious assault ships
 Project 23560 destroyers / cruisers / ASWs (planned)
 Tankers, Oceanographic, Coast Guard MVD and other  vessels
 Many of the metal hardware beam barges for the Crimean Bridge
 Passenger hydrofoil boats (hulls)

Notable vessels

See also 
 List of ships of Russia by project number
 List of Soviet and Russian submarine classes

References

External links 
 Official website
 Port of the shipyard

 
Shipbuilding companies of Crimea
Shipbuilding companies of the Soviet Union
1938 establishments in the Soviet Union
Buildings and structures in Kerch
Enterprises of Kerch